The 1865 Philadelphia mayoral election saw the election of Morton McMichael.

Results

References

1865
Philadelphia
Philadelphia mayoral
19th century in Philadelphia